The America's Cup Building, also known locally as Veles e Vents, is located in Valencia, Spain. The building was designed by the British architect David Chipperfield and inaugurated in 2006.

The design has won numerous architectural awards, including the 2006 Emirates Glass LEAF Award and the Royal Institute of British Architects European awards in 2007. It was also nominated for the Stirling Prize in 2007.

References

External links
Archiplanet: America's Cup Pavilion

Buildings and structures completed in 2006
David Chipperfield buildings